Łęczno may refer to the following places:
Łęczno, Greater Poland Voivodeship (west-central Poland)
Łęczno, Łódź Voivodeship (central Poland)
Łęczno, West Pomeranian Voivodeship (north-west Poland)